Aleksandar Vasilev (born 3 July 1985) is a retired footballer from North Macedonia.

References

External links
 

1985 births
Living people
Sportspeople from Strumica
Association football central defenders
Macedonian footballers
FK Sileks players
FK Makedonija Gjorče Petrov players
FK Horizont Turnovo players
Alta IF players
FK Rabotnički players
FK Napredok players
Yangon United F.C. players
Zeyashwemye F.C. players
FK Bregalnica Štip players
FK Belasica players
FC Struga players
FK Ohrid players
Macedonian First Football League players
Norwegian First Division players
Macedonian Second Football League players
Macedonian expatriate footballers
Expatriate footballers in Norway
Macedonian expatriate sportspeople in Norway
Expatriate footballers in Myanmar
Macedonian expatriate sportspeople in Myanmar